Into the Flames is a 2014 South Korean television series. It aired on cable channel TV Chosun on Fridays and Saturdays at 23:00 for 20 episodes from April 25 to June 28, 2014.

Synopsis
Based on the life of Park Tae-joon, founder and honorary chairman of multinational steel-making company POSCO, this is the story of the people who battled poverty and despair after the colonial era and the Korean War with a relentless pursuit of economic innovation, and the choices they made in the name of love, loyalty and sacrifice. Park worked tirelessly to build a mill that produced steel, which became pivotal to Korea's modernization.

The early working title was Park's moniker Steel King.

Cast

Main characters
Choi Soo-jong as Park Tae-hyung 
Kim Kwon as young Park Tae-hyung
Ryu Jin as Shin Dae-chul 
Yoon Hong-bin as young Shin Dae-chul
Son Tae-young as Kumiko 
Kim Ye-won as young Kumiko
Lee In-hye as Jang Ok-sun
Choi Cheol-ho as Choi Jong-ho
Dokgo Young-jae as the President
Jung Ho-bin as Alan Kissinger

Supporting characters
Yeongil Bay Steel Mill
Hong Il-kwon as Hwang Joon-suk
Park Sang-myun as Park Jong-yeol
Lee Ki-chan as Ahn Seung-joo
Kim Jin-keun as Kim Byung-hoon
Lee Won-seok as Yeon Bong-chool
Gong Jeong-hwan as Jung Sang-ho
Lee Jong-soo as Kim Sang-chul
Lee Jeong-yong as Choi Dal-ho
Choi Kyu-hwan as Chae Ki-joo
Hong Ah-reum as Ha Cheo-soon

Shinsekai Trading Company
Lee Chul-min as Takeda 
Kim Hyun-joon as young Takeda
Go Myung-hwan as Abe 
Kim Min-ho as young Abe

Extended cast
Lee Young-hoo as Yasuoka
Jeon Soo-kyeong as Yang Hwa-ja
Cho Young-seo Mrs. Seoul
Hyun Suk as Tae-hyung's father
Kim Min-kyung as Tae-hyung's mother
Park Yong-soo as Kohei
Jung Myung-hwan as Yamamoto
 Kim Ki-doo

References

External links
Into the Flames official website 

2014 South Korean television series debuts
2014 South Korean television series endings
TV Chosun television dramas